The UK National Tide Gauge Network is part of the National Tidal and Sea Level Facility. It was set up in 1953 to record sea levels around the coast of the UK, after the east coast of England was affected by severe floods.

Gauges positioned at 43 locations around the UK coast record data which is archived at the British Oceanographic Data Centre in Liverpool. Once quality controlled, this data is made available for scientific use.

External links 

 National Tidal & Sea Level Facility 
 Tide Gauge data from the British Oceanographic Data Centre

1953 establishments in the United Kingdom
Natural Environment Research Council
Oceanographic organizations
Organizations established in 1953
Sea level